Konstantin Stanić (18 November 1757 – 31 July 1830) was a Croatian Greek Catholic hierarch. He was the bishop from 1815 to 1830 of the Eastern Catholic Eparchy of Križevci.

Born in Mrzlo Polje Žumberačko, Habsburg monarchy  (present day – Croatia) in 1757, he was ordained a priest on 15 September 1782 for the Eparchy of Križevci. Fr. Stanić was the Rector of the Greek Catholic Seminary in Zagreb from 1782 to 1785 and again from 1807 to 1809.

He was confirmed as the Bishop by the Holy See on 15 March 1815. He was consecrated to the Episcopate on 10 September 1815. The principal consecrator was Bishop Samuil Vulcan.

He died in Križevci on 31 July 1830.

References 

1757 births
1830 deaths
19th-century Eastern Catholic bishops
Croatian Eastern Catholics
Greek Catholic Church of Croatia and Serbia